Hectaphelia kapakoana is a species of moth of the family Tortricidae. It is found in South Africa.

The wingspan is about 16 mm. The ground colour of the forewings is cream, with groups of orange scales submedially and orange markings. The hindwings are brownish.

References

Endemic moths of South Africa
Moths described in 2006
Archipini